The Puerto Rico Tip-Off was an early-season college basketball tournament owned and operated by ESPN Regional Television that took place in late November of each year from 2007 through 2017, usually the week before Thanksgiving.

History
The Puerto Rico Tip-Off began in 2007. From 2007 to 2011, it was held in José Miguel Agrelot Coliseum in San Juan, Puerto Rico. In 2012, it took place in Coliseo Rubén Rodríguez in Bayamón, Puerto Rico. From 2013 to 2015, Roberto Clemente Coliseum in San Juan hosted it.

In 2016, plans to hold the tournament at Roberto Clemente Coliseum were scrapped due to a Zika virus outbreak in Puerto Rico, and it was held instead at HP Field House at Walt Disney World Resort in Orlando, Florida, temporarily renamed the Tire Pros Invitational for 2016. Plans called for the tournament to return to Puerto Rico in 2017 and take place at the Coliseo Tomás Dones in Fajardo, Puerto Rico, but widespread damage in Puerto Rico by Hurricane Maria in September 2017 caused the 2017 edition of the tournament to be moved as well, to the HTC Center on the campus of Coastal Carolina University in Conway, South Carolina.

The 2017 tournament was the final one for the Puerto Rico Tip-Off. Since 2018, the Myrtle Beach Invitational has taken place at the HTC Center instead.

Champions

2017 Tournament
The 2017 field of eight teams to compete in the 2017 Puerto Rico Tip-Off was unveiled on July 26, 2017. Due to the aftermath of Hurricane Maria, the 2017 tournament took place at the HTC Center on the campus of Coastal Carolina University in Conway, South Carolina.
 All times Eastern.

Campus Site Games

Championship Round

2016 Tournament (Tire Pros Invitational)

The 2016 tournament took place at HP Field House in Orlando, Florida due to a Zika virus outbreak in Puerto Rico, and temporarily was renamed the Tire Pros Invitational Tournament.

2015 Tournament

2014 Tournament

2013 Tournament

Campus Site Games

Championship Round

2012 Tournament
 

All Times Eastern

2011 Tournament
November 17–20

{{2TeamBracket
| RD1=3rd Place Game
| RD1-seed1= 
| RD1-team1=Temple
| RD1-score1=78OT
| RD1-seed2= 
| RD1-team2=Wichita State
| RD1-score2=74
}}

2010 TournamentNovember 18–21‡ tournament record for most points scored in a game

2009 TournamentNovember 19–222008 TournamentNovember 20–232007 TournamentNovember 15–18'''

References

External links

College men's basketball competitions in the United States
Basketball competitions in Puerto Rico
2007 establishments in Puerto Rico
2017 disestablishments in Puerto Rico
Recurring sporting events established in 2007
Recurring sporting events disestablished in 2017